National football teams from Vietnam has qualified for five AFC Asian Cups so far:

 In 1956, 1960 as South Vietnam (represent Republic of Vietnam)
 In 2007, 2019 and 2023 as Vietnam (represent Socialist Republic of Vietnam)

With the establishment of the AFC Asian Cup in 1956, the Republic of Vietnam (South Vietnam), had made its first appearances in the two maiden 1956 and 1960 editions, since South Vietnam team was a member of FIFA in contrast to the national team of the Democratic Republic of Vietnam (North Vietnam). South Vietnam won fourth place in both editions. By the end of the Vietnam War however, this would be Vietnam's only appearances in the AFC Asian Cup for 47 years, due to the country's total destruction aftermath and subsequent conflicts between Vietnam and its neighbours. This had a serious impact and weakened Vietnam from a football powerhouse into one of Asia's weakest teams.

After returning to football in the 1990s, Vietnam did not participate in the Asian Cup for 11 consecutive editions before being selected as host in 2007 together with Thailand, Indonesia and Malaysia. Despite these 47 years of failing to qualify, Vietnam surprised the continent in 2007 with a 2–0 victory over the UAE, a draw with Qatar and in spite of losing 1–4 to Asia's giant Japan, Vietnam qualified to the quarter-finals while three other co-hosts failed to do so, before losing to eventual champions Iraq.

However, after the dramatic run in 2007, Vietnam failed to qualify again for the 2011 and 2015 editions, before finally returning in the 2019 AFC Asian Cup. With the recent rise of Vietnamese football on the international stage, such as the participation of the fustal and U-20 team in the 2016 FIFA Futsal World Cup and 2017 FIFA U-20 World Cup; especially the Olympic team, which won the silver medal in the 2018 AFC U-23 Championship, Vietnam was expected to shine in the 2019 Asian Cup despite being positioned with so many hard and difficult opponents. Vietnam then reached the quarter-finals.

South Vietnam

1956 Asian Cup 

South Vietnam participated in the inaugural edition of the Asian Cup, having edged Malaya in a 7–3 aggregate qualification, together with three other teams, host Hong Kong, South Korea and Israel. It would be Vietnam's debut in the Asian Cup.

In the opening match against host Hong Kong, then-Asia's top teams, South Vietnam could manage only a 2–2 draw over the host.

In the second game, South Vietnam would have been edged, but not without putting a good fight towards Israel, in a 1–2 defeat.

In the last match, South Vietnam and South Korea created a thriller, which ended with the 5–3 victory for the Koreans. Eventually, South Vietnam won fourth place for the first time, and also their best result to date.

1960 Asian Cup 

South Vietnam would have made their second debut in the tournament, after successfully edged Singapore and Malaya in the qualification round. In there, they once again faced South Korea and Israel, with debutant Republic of China. It would be a more disappointing performance than four years ago, as South Vietnam were all defeated in three matches, especially losing 1–5 to both South Korea and Israel. South Vietnam won fourth place twice, and it would have remained as Vietnam's only two appearances in the Asian Cup for the next 47 years.

Since then, due to the later Vietnam War and subsequent conflicts, Vietnam could not play any big tournament for the next 47 years, before returning to international stage in 2007.

Socialist Republic of Vietnam

2007 Asian Cup 

In 2004, Vietnam, together with Indonesia, Malaysia and Thailand were awarded as hosts for the 2007 AFC Asian Cup, signalled the return of a national team from Vietnam after 47 years. However, Vietnam was pushed into a tough group, consisting three champions: Japan, then-Asian champions; the United Arab Emirates, then-Gulf champions and Qatar, with the squad mostly made up from 2006 Asian Games in which Qatar won the gold medal. Being in a tough group, Vietnam was not expected to pass through nor even having a point, but rather just a point basket for these teams.

Nonetheless, under Austrian manager Alfred Riedl, Vietnam stunned all predictions. In the opening account, Vietnam surprised by defeating Gulf champions UAE, before drew another Gulf team, Qatar. Although losing the final match against Japan, Vietnam wrote history as the only host to qualify for the tournament's quarter-finals while Thailand, Indonesia and Malaysia failed to do so. However, Vietnam would have to end their fairytale after being defeated by latter champion Iraq. It remains as Vietnam's best performance ever since the reunification of Vietnam.

Group stage

Knockout stage

Quarter-finals

2019 Asian Cup 

Vietnam would have to wait for another twelve years to return for the AFC Asian Cup, this time to be hosted in the UAE. By then, Vietnam was placed with strong opponents, including two former Asian champions, Iran and Iraq, with the unknown debutant Yemen. This is the third time Vietnam was drawn with Asia's no. 1 team, this time is Iran, after having drawn with South Korea in two inaugural editions, and Japan in 2007 editions.

Although Vietnam showed a great effort in the first two matches, the young team could not get any point. In the last match against Yemen, Quang Hai scored a goal before Ngoc Hai secured a win for Vietnam by a successful penalty kick. Vietnam had to wait until the last match of the group stage between Lebanon and North Korea to see the team can go to the knock-out stage. Vietnam and Lebanon finished their matches with their same statistics. However, Vietnam was the last team to enter Round of 16 by having a higher discipline score (Vietnam −5, Lebanon −7). This is the second time Vietnam qualified for the knock-out stage.

Vietnam was considered as the underdogs when facing Jordan in the Round of 16. Jordan did not concede any goal in the group stage after two wins against the defending champion Australia and Syria, and a draw with Palestine after already qualified to the knock-out stage as group winner. However, Jordan decided to play defensively and Vietnam dominated the match. After 120 minutes, the score was 1–1. Vietnam won the match after the penalty shootout and qualified to the quarterfinals.

Vietnam faced Japan, the most successful team at the Asian Cup, in the quarterfinals. It was the first match ever of the Asian Cup history using VAR. Japan was denied a goal in the first half and awarded a penalty in the second half – which was converted into the only goal of the match.

Group state

Knockout stage

Round of 16

Quarter-finals

Top goalscorers

Overview

As South Vietnam

As Vietnam

References 

 
Countries at the AFC Asian Cup